Eleven referendums were held in Switzerland during 2001. The first three were held on 4 March on popular initiatives on joining the European Union, lowering medicine prices and lowering the urban speed limit to 30 km/h in most places. All three were rejected by voters. The next three referendums were held on 10 June on two separate amendments to the federal law on the Swiss army and on a federal resolution on abolishing the requirement for a permit to establish a diocese, all of which were approved.

The final five referendums were held on 2 December on federal resolution on expenditure, which was approved, and four popular initiatives, all of which were rejected. The popular initiatives were "for an assured Aged and Bereaved insurance - tax on energy instead of work," "for an authentic security policy and a Switzerland without army," "Solidarity creates security: for a voluntary civilian peace service" and "for a capital gains tax."

Results

References

See also 
 Switzerland–European Union relations

2001 elections in Switzerland
2001 referendums
Referendums in Switzerland
Conscription referendums
Referendums related to European Union accession
Switzerland–European Union relations